Uppala is a town in Kasaragod district, in the Indian state of Kerala. It is known for its Hindu temples and Muslim mosques.

Temples

The following is a list of temples situated in Uppala and the neighboring areas:

 Aila Shri Durgaparameshwari Temple, one of the oldest in Uppala
 Sri Krishna Temple Pathwady, another one of the oldest temples
 Mulinja Mahalingeshwera Temple, which is situated 1 km away from the town centre 
 Vamanjoor Sri Guthyamma Bhagavathi Temple 
 Kondevoor Sri Gayathri Matha Temple, the first Gayatri Matha Temple of Kerala 
 Ambaru Sri Sadhasiva Temple 
 Ayyappa Bhajana Mandir, which resides opposite of the Uppala Railway Station 
 Kambar Sri Durga Parameshwari Temple
 Kanakappady Shri Mahsvishu Temple 
 Sri Brahmasri Mogera Daivasthanam located in Chavadikatte
 Chevar Temple
 Sri Durgaparameshwari Bhajana Mandir located in both Permude and Sudembala
 Bayar Temple 
 Sri Panchalingeshwara Temple in Bayar
 Sri Vishnumoorthy Temple in Chippar
 Sri Sharada Bhajana Mandir in Sharada Nagar, Uppala
 Bhagavathi Temple, located in Uppala

Mosques

Similarly to the temples, there are a number of mosques situated in Uppala. Listed below are the following residing in there and its neighbouring surroundings:
 Kunnil Mohiyaddeen Juma Masjid at Uppala Gate
 Ayyoor Peringady Juma Masjid, which is the biggest and the oldest one in Uppala
 Ahle Sunnath Hanafi Jamia Masjid
 Pathwady Mohiyaddin Juma Masjid
 Uppala Salafi Masjid
 Hydrose Jumha Masjid Uppala Gate
 Mosoodi Jumha Masjid
 Adeeka Juma Masjid
 Madeena Masjid 
 Mohammadiya Masjid Manimunda
 Mallangai Fakeer Vali Darga Shareef
 Mallangai Juma Masjid
 Cherugoli old and new Masjid
 Mubarak Masjid Mannankuzhi
 Najmul Huda Masjid at Ambar Nayabazar 
 Qizar Masjid Parakkatta
 New Masjid at Bappaithotty
 Noor Masjid, close by to Sonkal Saksharatha Bus Stand
 Oberla Masjid
 Badriya Masjid (Known as Pakracha's Masjid)
 Firduose Masjid Firdouse Nagar in Mannsmkuzhi
 Mohammediya Masjid Hidayath Nagar
 Jamalia Juma Masjid Kubanoor
 Badriya Masjid Hidayath Bazar
 Noor -e - Madeena Masjid
 Golden Galli
 Masjid Al Quba Kodibail
 Sonkal Badriya Juma Masjid
 Thurthi Bilal Masjid
 Badriya Juma Masjid Bandiyod
 Bilal Juma Masjid Adka
 Subuhaniya Juma Masjid Subuhaniya Nagar Adka
 Ambar Masjid near Doddi in Naya Bazar
 Darvesh complex Masjid
 Noor Masjid Pachilampara

 
Mosques in Kerala
Uppala
Uppala